The Legislative Council was the legislature of British Guiana between 1928 and 1953 and again from 1954 until 1961.

History
The Legislative Council was created by constitutional reforms in 1928, which abolished the 22-member Combined Court and replaced it with the 30-member Council. The new Council included an extra eight appointees, and consisted of the Governor, two ex-officio members, eight official members, five unofficial members and 14 members elected in single-member constituencies. The new council met for the first time on 28 November 1928. The first elections were held in 1930 and 1935.

Due to the outbreak of World War II, elections did not happen again until 1947, with the Council elected in 1935 becoming known as the "Long Parliament". Constitutional amendments in 1943 saw the number of appointed members reduced from 16 to 11, giving the elected members a majority. The 1947 elections were held under this system.

As a result of the Waddington Commission, further constitutional reforms were enacted in 1952; universal suffrage was introduced and the Legislative Council was to be replaced by a House of Assembly. The term of the final Legislative Council was extended in order to allow preparations for elections under the new system on 27 April 1953. The Council was dissolved on 8 April 1953.

However, the constitution was suspended on 9 October 1953 and the House of Assembly was prorogued, before being dissolved on 21 December. A wholly appointed Interim Legislative Council was established and met for the first time on 5 January 1954. The Interim Legislative Council had 28 members, including the Speaker, three ex-officio members, four members with portfolio, three members without portfolio, two official members and 15 unofficial members, several of whom had previously been elected members.

The Interim Legislative Council remained in place until it was dissolved on 29 June 1957, after which elections for a new Legislative Council were held on 12 August. It consisted of the Speaker, three official members, six nominated members and 14 elected members.

A new constitution was promulgated in July 1961. It abolished the Legislative Council for a second time, replacing it with a bicameral Legislature including a 13-member Senate and a 36-member Legislative Assembly. Elections to the new Legislature were held on 21 August.

Members

1928–30

1930–53

References

Political history of Guyana
British Guiana
Historical legislatures
1928 establishments in British Guiana
1953 disestablishments in British Guiana
1954 establishments in British Guiana
1961 disestablishments in British Guiana